English words
Religious slurs for people
Sex- and gender-related slurs